Jani Beyglu (also Romanized as Jānī Beyglū; also known as Janbeg, Janibegla, Jānī Beqlā, and Janī Bighloo) is a village in Peyghan Chayi Rural District, in the Central District of Kaleybar County, East Azerbaijan Province, Iran. At the 2006 census, its population was 117, in 25 families.

References 

Populated places in Kaleybar County